Allen Neuringer is an American psychologist. He is a highly published and well regarded scientist in the field of the experimental analysis of behavior, as pioneered by B.F. Skinner. His areas of research include human volition studies, the generation of randomness in organisms, self-experimentation, and many other areas. He received his B.A. at Columbia College in 1962, and his PhD from Harvard University in 1967. He served on National Institute of Health (NIH) and National Science Foundation (NSF) committees, received numerous awards and grants for his research, and has published widely. As of June 2008, Neuringer retired as a professor of psychology at Reed College.

Early life and education
Neuringer was born ca. 1940. He received his B.A. at Columbia College. He did his PhD at Harvard University.

Career

As of June 2008, Neuringer retired as a professor of psychology at Reed College.

He has also been an editor or assistant editor on four journals, and currently is an editor for the Journal of the Experimental Analysis of Behavior (JEAB). He has been a reviewer on 23 journals, including Science and the Journal of Applied Behavior Analysis.

He served on National Institute of Health (NIH) and National Science Foundation (NSF) committees.

Research interests
Neuringer is a social scientist in the field of the experimental analysis of behavior, as pioneered by B.F. Skinner. His areas of research include human volition studies, the generation of randomness in organisms, self-experimentation, and many other areas.

Randomness and behavior
Neuringer's work focused on the production of "pure randomness" in human and other organismic behavior, something that was widely considered impossible. Matching and reinforcing human and animal responses to a random number generator he was able to have humans and other organisms behave "randomly".

Melioration and self-experimentation
Neuringer has suggested that behavior analysis as a field might benefit from using experimental designs that explicitly and directly attempted to meliorate the condition of an experimental subject. He envisaged placing practical everyday goals as the objective of experiments and, especially, self-experiments.

Awards and recognition

Neuringer's work has received numerous NSF/NIMH grants.

Personal life
Neuringer, with his wife, live in a house they built in a forested area in the State of Oregon.

Representative publications

References

Further reading
Articles from published sources that may be of interest, in the expansion of this article, or for further exploration by readers, include the following.

Research related to behavioural response structures

Research related to musical recognition

Scholarly accounts
The following secondary source accounts appear about his animal research related to musical recognition, in 1984:

Popular accounts
The following popular accounts appear about this same 1984 work:

Other matters

External links
 Neuringer's faculty web page at Reed College
 Neuringer's CV

21st-century American psychologists
Living people
1940s births
Columbia College (New York) alumni
Harvard University alumni
Reed College faculty
20th-century American psychologists